A Glimpse of Paradise is a 1934 British crime film directed by Ralph Ince and starring George Carney, Eve Lister and Wally Patch.

It was made as a quota quickie at Teddington Studios by the British subsidiary of Warner Brothers. It is now considered a lost film.

Cast
 George Carney as Jim Bogsworth  
 Eve Lister as Marion Fielding  
 Robert Cochran as Norman Ware  
 Wally Patch as Harry  
 Winifred Oughton as Mrs. Latter  
 Roddy Hughes as Walter Fielding  
 Katie Johnson as Mrs. Fielding  
 Margaret Yarde as Mrs. Kidd  
 D. J. Williams as Bert Kidd  
 Fred Groves as Joshua Ware

References

Bibliography
 Chibnall, Steve. Quota Quickies: The Birth of the British 'B' Film. British Film Institute, 2007.
 Low, Rachael. Filmmaking in 1930s Britain. George Allen & Unwin, 1985.
 Wood, Linda. British Films, 1927-1939. British Film Institute, 1986.

External links

1934 films
British crime drama films
1930s crime drama films
1930s English-language films
Films directed by Ralph Ince
Quota quickies
Films shot at Teddington Studios
Warner Bros. films
Lost British films
British black-and-white films
1934 comedy films
1934 drama films
1930s British films